Other Women's Clothes is a 1922 American silent drama film directed by Hugo Ballin and starring Mabel Ballin, Raymond Bloomer and Crauford Kent.

Synopsis
Wishing to help financially support a struggling model he has fallen in love with, a wealthy man invents a secret wealthy relative who leaves her a fortune as inheritance. However, when she discovers his deception she disappears and they are only reunited some years later after a chance meeting following a car accident.

Cast
 Mabel Ballin as Jacqueline Lee
 Raymond Bloomer as Barker Garrison
 Crauford Kent as Rupert Lewis
 May Kitson as Mrs. Roger Montayne
 William H. Strauss as Joe Feinberg
 Aggie La Field as Bessie Horowitz
 Rose Burdick as Ellen Downe

References

Bibliography
 Munden, Kenneth White. The American Film Institute Catalog of Motion Pictures Produced in the United States, Part 1. University of California Press, 1997.

External links
 

1922 films
1922 drama films
1920s English-language films
American silent feature films
Silent American drama films
American black-and-white films
Films directed by Hugo Ballin
Films distributed by W. W. Hodkinson Corporation
1920s American films